"Ang Huling El Bimbo" ('The Last El Bimbo') is a song composed by Ely Buendia of the Philippine pop/rock band Eraserheads, for their 1995 studio album Cutterpillow. It received extensive airplay after its release and ranked #2 on RX 93.1's "Top 20 OPM Requests of 1996". It is the only Tagalog song included in the band's international compilation album, Aloha Milkyway (1998). The song's music video catapulted the band's success outside the Philippines by bagging the 'International Viewer's Choice Awards for Asia' at the 1997 MTV Video Music Awards.

A musical of the same name was shown last 2018 at Resorts World Manila, then again in 2019, and later made available for streaming online in May 2020 for a limited time.

Music video
The song's accompanying music video was directed by Auraeus Solito and completed filming within two days at Solito's ancestral house in Sampaloc, Manila. As a theatre director, Solito used several experimental shots and symbolisms in the video despite being a literal translation of the story contained in the song. According to Buendia, this was the first major production music video of the band since it involved big-budget due to casting; and being treated as a short film due to the song's playing time and storyline. This also marked the first time the Eraserheads produced a music video for their song. The instrumental part of the music video was omitted during its broadcast on MTV Pinoy. After the music video fades to black, the music video ends, when it originally had more scenes like the adult Paraluman lookalike (Rowena Basco) rising from a pile of dried leaves.

It was released through GMA Supershow on February 25, 1996.

The music video won the 'International Viewer's Choice Awards for Asia' at the 1997 MTV Video Music Awards held at Radio City Music Hall in New York City. The video was up against "Kirana" by Dewa 19 of Indonesia, "Fun Fun Fun" by Joey Boy of Thailand, "Fanatik" by KRU of Malaysia, and "Family" by Lee Seung-hwan of Korea. The Eraserheads accepted the award themselves. The recognition was the first Moonman award received by any Filipino artist, and further made the band known in Asia which paved the way to the release of Aloha Milkyway.

Covers
Rico J. Puno performed the song for the 2005 Eraserheads tribute album Ultraelectromagneticjam!: The Music of the Eraserheads. 
Philippine punk rock band Kamikazee recorded an unreleased version of the song.
Philippine group of singers The CompanY made a rendition of the song in 2008 with a music video interpreted in a different way from the song's content.
South Border pianist Jay Durias performed the song for another Eraserheads tribute album, The Reunion: An Eraserheads Tribute Album, released in 2012. 
Korean acoustic fingerstyle guitarist Sungha Jung performed the song during his "2013.6 Philippine Tour" concert.
Rivermaya lead vocalist from 2007-2011 Jason Fernandez covered the song as a Wishclusive on Wish 107.5 last 2016.
Janine Berdin performed the song at the SemiFinals, Season2 of Tawag ng Tanghalan in 2018.

In other media
Buendia sang the song as a guest artist for a FilharmoniKA album, Kumpas: An Orchestral Celebration of Pinoy Music, which presented some of the signature alternative rock anthems of the '90s orchestrally.
When local radio station NU 107 signed off for the last time on 8 November 2010, "Ang Huling El Bimbo" played as its final song.
The song was also played in a McDonald's commercial in the Philippines in 2009.

Personnel
Marcus Adoro - Lead guitar
Ely Buendia - Vocals, rhythm guitar
Raimund Marasigan - Drums
Buddy Zabala - Bass guitar

References

Eraserheads songs
1995 songs
1995 singles
Rock ballads
Songs written by Ely Buendia
Tagalog-language songs